Skendylinae is a subfamily of earwigs in the family Forficulidae. There are about 12 genera and more than 60 described species in Skendylinae.

Genera
These 12 genera belong to the subfamily Skendylinae:

 Afrocosmia Hincks, 1960
 Brachycosmiella Steinmann, 1990
 Cosmiella Verhoeff, 1902
 Cosmiola Bey-Bienko, 1959
 Forcepsia Moreira, 1930
 Kleter Burr, 1907
 Liparura Burr, 1907
 Lipodes Burr, 1907
 Mixocosmia Borelli, 1909
 Neocosmiella Hebard, 1919
 Obelura Burr, 1907
 Paracosmiella Steinmann, 1990

References

Further reading

 
 

Forficulidae